Jordanston Halt railway station was an intermediate stop on the Great Western Railway's line to . It served the hamlet of Jordanston, Pembrokeshire, Wales between 1923 and 1964.

History
No intermediate stations were provided either when the Clarbeston Road and Letterston Railway connected into the existing line at Letterston Junction in 1906.

The halt was close to the top of a 1 in 100 gradient sloping down towards Letterston Junction. Initially there were two platforms, but the double line north of Letterston Junction was singled on 9 March 1958 and the former up platform then served both directions. The facilities were basic: the platform surface was of cinders no higher than the rails - portable steps were used to board trains; and there was a small wooden shelter.

The station was served by trains on two routes. In July 1929, on the older route between Clynderwen and  via Rosebush there were two trains a day towards Clynderwen, and three towards Fishguard and Goodwick (one of which continued to ); all of these called at Jordanston Halt. On Sundays there was one train to Fishguard Harbour and one to Clarbeston Road.

Along with four other stations in Pembrokeshire, Jordanston Halt closed on 6 April 1964.

References

External links
Jordanston Halt Station on navigable 1954 O.S. map

Disused railway stations in Pembrokeshire
Former Great Western Railway stations
Railway stations in Great Britain opened in 1923
Railway stations in Great Britain closed in 1964
Beeching closures in Wales